Hillside Colony may refer to:

 Hillside Colony, Montana
 Hillside Colony, South Dakota